George Paul Engelhardt (1871–1942) was an American entomologist.

Biography
Engelhardt was born in 1871, in Germany, where he also received his education. He came to the United States as an emigrant in 1889, and became a citizen. In 1903, he began working for the Brooklyn Museum, where he worked till his retirement in 1930. His keen interest was Aegeriidae, a family of moths. He was assisting younger generations of men, and educated them about the field, which generated a number of entomologists that came out due to his efforts, and one of them was Barnard D. Burks. He wrote only one book called American Clear-Wing Moths of the Family Aegeriidae that was not published until 4 years after his death, in 1942.

References

External links
 

1871 births
1942 deaths
German emigrants to the United States
American entomologists
German lepidopterists
Date of birth missing
Date of death missing
Naturalized citizens of the United States